Czarina Aya-ay Saloma-Akpedonu is a Filipino sociologist who is a professor in the department of sociology and anthropology at Ateneo de Manila University.

Education
Saloma-Akpedonu has a bachelor's degree from the University of the Philippines Diliman, a master's degree from Peking University in China, and a doctorate (Dr. rer. soc.) from Bielefeld University in Germany.

Books
Saloma-Akpedonu is the author of books including:
Possible Worlds in Impossible Spaces: Globality, Knowledge, Gender and Information Technology in the Philippines (Ateneo de Manila University Press, 2006)
Casa Boholana: Vintage Houses of Bohol (with Erik Akpedonu, Ateneo de Manila University Press, 2011)
Many Journeys, Many Voices: The Life and Times of Filipina Overseas Workers, 1960-2010 (with Edna Manlapaz and Yael Buencamino, 2015, Anvil Publishing 
Food Consumption in the City: Practices and Patterns in Urban Asia and the Pacific (edited volume with Marlyne Sahakian and Suren Erkman, Routledge, 2016)

Recognition
The National Academy of Science and Technology of the Philippines named Saloma-Akpedonu an outstanding young scientist in 2007.
She has also served as president of the Philippine Sociological Society and the Women's Studies Association of the Philippines.

References

External links

1970 births
Living people
Filipino women scientists
University of the Philippines alumni
Peking University alumni
Bielefeld University alumni
Filipino sociologists
Filipino women sociologists
21st-century Filipino scientists
Academic staff of Ateneo de Manila University
People from Bohol